Wolves at the Door is a 2016 American horror film directed by John R. Leonetti and written by Gary Dauberman. The film is loosely based on the murder of Sharon Tate, the wife of Roman Polanski, and her friends in 1969 by members of the Manson Family, and takes place within The Conjuring Universe. The cast features Katie Cassidy, Elizabeth Henstridge, Adam Campbell and Miles Fisher as four friends who are stalked and murdered by a group of intruders at a farewell party.

The film, produced by New Line Cinema and The Safran Company and distributed by Warner Bros. Pictures, was first theatrically released in India on October 21, 2016, followed by Germany on March 2, 2017, and in the United Kingdom on March 17, 2017. It was released on Digital HD in the United States on April 18, 2017. It received very negative reviews from critics, garnering a rare 0% approval rating on Rotten Tomatoes. The film was mainly criticized for its depiction of the Tate murders and was described as "exploitative" and "misconceived."

Plot
In 1969, John and Mary, a married couple sleeping in bed, are awakened in the middle of the night by knocks on their doors and windows. John goes downstairs to investigate but finds nothing. As he gets back into bed, he hears a crash downstairs. He sees the shadow of a man saying "Little Pig". As he runs back to his room to his wife, he locks the door. After calling the police, the intruders break open the door. Later, the intruders write messages in blood on the walls of the house, but leave before Detective Clarkin and the police arrive at the scene.

The following night, Sharon, Jay, Wojciech, and Abigail commemorate Abigail's upcoming move back to Boston with a celebratory dinner at El Coyote in Hollywood, even though Wojciech is upset that Abby is allowing her parents to influence her decision. After dinner, the four friends return to Sharon's house for the evening. A pregnant Sharon calls her husband from the nursery, but suddenly the line goes dead. Meanwhile, Steven arrives at the property to see his friend William, who lives in the guesthouse. After selling William a stereo, Steven tries to leave, only to find the driveway gate disabled. He gets out and opens the gate, but his vehicle turns off unexpectedly. As he returns to his vehicle, he turns his headlights on to see a man standing in front of his truck and a woman standing behind his truck. He is then pulled out of the vehicle and stabbed to death.

Wojciech goes outside to have a cigarette. As he approaches the truck in the driveway, he sees a man slumped over. He approaches the truck, but the man lunges at him and chases him to the front door which is locked. The attackers stab Wojciech drag his body back to the house and leave him in the shower. Later, the intruders write the word "Pig" in blood on the front door. In Sharon's bedroom, she and Abigail become concerned when they observe a young woman prowling the premises. Meanwhile, Jay is stabbed to death while sleeping on the couch. When the two hear Jay screaming, they return to discover his dead body and try to hide throughout the house as the intruders stalk them. While Abigail fights with an attacker, Sharon hides in the bathroom and finds Wojciech, who is still alive. One intruder breaks down the door to capture both Sharon and Wojciech. Sharon and Wojciech are dragged through the hallway as Abigail escapes the house.

Abigail tries to get help from William, but he is unable to hear because of his music. One of the intruders catches Abigail and carries her to the house. She is taken back to a bedroom where Sharon and Wojciech are also being held. An intruder enters the bedroom and drags Sharon away. Wojciech and Abigail fight their way outside, but Wojciech is stabbed to death on the lawn. An injured Abigail makes it to the street to flag down a car, but finds it is occupied by two of the intruders. She falls to the ground, gazing at the locket Sharon gave to her, as the two intruders approach her with a bloodstained sledgehammer.

The film ends with a series of interviews of Charles Manson and the attackers.

Cast
 Katie Cassidy as Sharon Tate
 Elizabeth Henstridge as Abigail Folger
 Adam Campbell as Wojciech Frykowski
 Miles Fisher as Jay Sebring
 Spencer Daniels as William Garretson  
 Lucas Adams as Steven Parent
 Chris Mulkey as John
 Jane Kaczmarek as Mary
 Eric Ladin as Detective Clarkin
 Arlen Escarpeta as Officer

Production

Development
On May 8, 2015, John R. Leonetti, was announced as the director of Wolves at the Door for New Line Cinema, with Gary Dauberman as screenwriter and Peter Safran as producer. The script was loosely based on the Manson Family murders in 1969. Known as the Tate murders, the event saw members of the Charles Manson cult break into the home of Sharon Tate, eight-and-a-half months pregnant, and her new husband director Roman Polanski. The director was shooting in Europe at the time, but Tate was entertaining three friends. They were all stabbed and shot to death multiple times. The project was described as "a home invasion thriller set in the 1960s but is not a retelling of the actual events, nor will it reference any Manson connection."

Casting
Casting was announced in May 2015, with Katie Cassidy playing the lead role of Sharon, alongside Miles Fisher as Jay, Elizabeth Henstridge as Abigail, and Adam Campbell as Wojciech.

Filming
Principal photography lasted from mid-May through late-June in Los Angeles in 2015.

Music
On September 18, 2015, Toby Chu was announced to be to scoring the soundtrack for Wolves at the Door. Chu had previously collaborated with Leonetti in Annabelle (2014).

Release
Wolves at the Door first opened theatrically in India on October 21, 2016. The film's first trailer was released on October 18, 2016. It was followed by a limited release in Germany on March 2, 2017, and in the United Kingdom on March 17, 2017. The film did not receive a theatrical release in the United States, but was eventually released on Digital HD by Warner Bros. Home Entertainment on April 17, 2017. It was rated R by the Motion Picture Association of America for "violence, terror and some language".

Reception
On review aggregator website Rotten Tomatoes, the film holds an approval rating of 0% based on 6 reviews, with an average rating of 2.8/10. Linda Marric of HeyUGuys gave the film two out of five stars, stating: "On the whole Wolves At The Door delivers some stellar performances and a genuinely terrifying story, but is largely let down by its makers inability to understand that there are limits to what can and cannot be shown on screen when it comes to the retelling of real life murders. Geoffrey McNab of The Independent called the film a "repellent, misconceived, and pointless film", awarding one out of five stars. Matthew Turner of The List also gave the film one star, calling it "a deeply distasteful mess". Mark Mukasa of The Upcoming gave the film one star, criticizing it for not "bringing anything new to the table" and noting: "it ends up being an unending stream of generic clichés in a genre already (at times unfairly) maligned for its derivativeness."

Terry Staunton of Radio Times criticized the film's tension and remarked that "Cassidy and co are portrayed as such irritating "beautiful people" that some may find themselves reluctant to root for them." Mark Kermode of The Guardian listed it as #1 on his list of "The Ten Worst Movies Of 2017 So Far", calling it "nasty, duplicitous, morally bankrupt and dramatically inept... and I hope to never have to mention or think about it ever again." He later called it the worst film of the year, saying it is a "a repellently exploitative entry in the already sordid “Manson movies” canon." Kermode has recently listed it as #5 in the "Worst Films of the Decade" on Episode 64 of his "Kermode on Film" podcast.

David Duprey of That Moment In gave the film two out of five stars, admiring Leonetti's direction, but acknowledging the film's basis on real life events as "distasteful". Kat Hughes of The Hollywood News gave the film two out of five stars, stating the film "had promise but failed to deliver", calling it "a bland and uninteresting attempt to bring to life one of the most interesting and dangerous cults in American history."

References

External links
 
 
 

2016 horror thriller films
2010s psychological horror films
2016 psychological thriller films
2016 films
2016 horror films
American horror thriller films
American psychological horror films
American psychological thriller films
American slasher films
Crime films based on actual events
Crime horror films
Cultural depictions of Charles Manson
Films about stalking
Films directed by John R. Leonetti
Films scored by Toby Chu
Films set in 1969
Films set in Los Angeles
Films shot in Los Angeles
Home invasions in film
American pregnancy films
Horror films based on actual events
New Line Cinema films
Thriller films based on actual events
Warner Bros. films
2010s English-language films
2010s American films